Rdeči Kal is a settlement in the hills to the southeast of Dobrnič in the Municipality of Trebnje in eastern Slovenia. It lies below the northern slope of Sharp Peak (523 m). The area is part of the historical region of Lower Carniola. The municipality is now included in the Southeast Slovenia Statistical Region.

References

External links
Rdeči Kal at Geopedia

Populated places in the Municipality of Trebnje